Tyler may refer to:

People and fictional characters
 Tyler (name), an English name; with lists of people with the surname or given name
 Tyler, the Creator (born 1991), American rap artist and producer
 John Tyler, 10th president of the United States
 Wat Tyler, killed 1381, leader of the 1381 Peasants' Revolt in England
 Tyler1 (born 1995), American internet personality and streamer on Twitch
 Tyler (Total Drama Island), a fictional character from the Total Drama series

Places

United States
 Tyler, California
 Tyler, California, the former name of Cherokee, Nevada County, California
 Tyler, Florida
 Tyler, Minnesota
 Tyler, Missouri
 Tyler, Texas, the largest US city named Tyler
 Tyler, Washington
 Tyler County, Texas
 Tyler County, West Virginia
 Tyler Hill, Pennsylvania
 Tyler Park, Louisville, Kentucky, a neighborhood
 Tylertown, Mississippi

State Parks
 Tyler State Park (Pennsylvania)
 Tyler State Park (Texas)

United Kingdom
 Tyler Hill, Kent
 Tylers Green, Buckinghamshire

Ships
 , a British frigate in service in the Royal Navy from 1944 to 1945
 , an American Civil War gunboat

Other uses
 Tyler (Masonic), the outer guard or door-keeper of a Masonic lodge 
 Tyler (65 nm SOI), the version codename for AMD's Turion 64 X2
 Tyler, New Hampshire, a fictional town depicted in the novels Black Tide, Dead Sand, and others by Brendan DuBois
 Tyler Block, a three-story building in Louisville, Kentucky
 Tyler mesh size (see Mesh (scale)), a unit for the opening size of sieves
 Tyler Technologies, a United States public sector company
 University of Texas at Tyler, in Tyler, Texas

See also
 Tiler (surname)